Ferdinand Bilali (born 10 April 1969) is an Albanian retired footballer who played for KF Elbasani, Bylis Ballsh, Erzeni Shijak and Egnatia Rrogozhinë, as well as the Albania national team.

International career
He made his debut for Albania as a second half sub for Arbën Milori in a September 1992 FIFA World Cup qualification match against Northern Ireland, his sole international game.

References

1969 births
Living people
Footballers from Elbasan
Albanian footballers
Association football midfielders
Albania under-21 international footballers
Albania international footballers
KF Elbasani players
KF Teuta Durrës players
KF Bylis Ballsh players
KF Erzeni players
KS Egnatia Rrogozhinë players
Kategoria Superiore players